Bosniaks of Serbia and Montenegro may refer to:

 Bosniaks of Serbia
 Bosniaks of Montenegro